Harry James Bright (September 22, 1929 – March 13, 2000) was an American professional baseball first baseman, third baseman and utility player in Major League Baseball over all or parts of eight seasons, from  to , for the Pittsburgh Pirates, Washington Senators, Cincinnati Reds, New York Yankees and Chicago Cubs.

Versatile journeyman
During his minor league playing career, Bright was known for his versatility in the field, his batting ability, and (during the era before free agency in baseball) his frequent changes of address. He played every infield position, caught and played the outfield. In a 12-year stretch, 1947 through 1958, he played for 14 different minor league teams and at least four different MLB organizations. At the plate, he led the Class C West Texas–New Mexico League in batting average in 1950 with a .413 mark. Two years later, as the 22-year-old playing manager of the Janesville Cubs of the Class D Wisconsin State League, Bright led the league in runs batted in with 101 — although Janesville finished seventh in the eight-team WSL.

Bright's best minor league season came when he was a 30-year-old veteran playing for the 1960 Salt Lake City Bees in the Pacific Coast League. He slugged 27 home runs, led the PCL with 119 RBI and batted .313. Bright was a fixture in the Pacific Coast League of the 1950s, having played three and a half seasons for the Sacramento Solons (1955–58). He became a resident of Sacramento, California, and later managed the Solons in 1975.

Major League career
On December 16, 1960, he was traded to the American League's new expansion franchise, the Washington Senators, where he played two full seasons and enjoyed his most sustained success. In , he appeared in 113 games, mostly at first base, swatted 17 homers, knocked in  67 RBI and batted .273. But at season's end, the Senators swapped the 33-year-old Bright to the Cincinnati Reds for a young first baseman, Rogelio Álvarez.

Bright batted only once for the  Reds before his contract was sold on April 21 to the defending world champion New York Yankees, who were seeking a right-handed hitter off their bench. He stuck with the club all season long, batting .236 with seven homers in 157 at-bats as the Yanks copped another AL pennant.

1963 World Series
Then, in Game 1 of the 1963 World Series, Bright made history when he was sent up as a ninth-inning pinch hitter against Sandy Koufax of the Los Angeles Dodgers. Bright struck out, enabling Koufax to set a new mark (broken five years later by Bob Gibson) for strikeouts (15) in a World Series game. Said Bright: "It's a hell of a thing. I wait 17 years to get into a World Series. Then I finally get up there, and 69,000 people are yelling — yelling for me to strike out." To compound matters, the game was played in Bright's home ballpark, Yankee Stadium.

Bright struck out again in his only other World Series at bat and by mid-May  he had returned to the minors with the Triple-A Richmond Virginians. His MLB career ended in 1965, as a pinch hitter for the Chicago Cubs. All told, Bright appeared in 309 MLB games over all or parts of eight seasons, batting .255 with 214 hits, 31 doubles, four triples, 32 homers and 126 RBI.

Post-playing career
In 1967, Bright "resumed" his minor league managerial career in the Cubs' farm system after a 15-year hiatus, taking over the reins of the Quincy Cubs of the Class A Midwest League, a decade and a half after his stint as playing skipper of the Cubbies' Janesville affiliate. He later managed in the Kansas City Royals, Oakland Athletics, Milwaukee Brewers and Atlanta Braves organizations, and scouted for the Montreal Expos. He died in Sacramento at the age of 70.

References

 Spink, C.C. Johnson, ed., The 1965 Official Baseball Register. St. Louis: The Sporting News, 1965.
 "K is for Koufax", Time, October 11, 1963

External links

Venezuelan Professional Baseball League statistics

1929 births
2000 deaths
American expatriate baseball players in Venezuela
Baseball players from Kansas City, Missouri
Baseball players from Sacramento, California
Birmingham Barons managers
Buffalo Bisons (minor league) players
Burlington Bees players
Chicago Cubs players
Cincinnati Reds players
Clovis Pioneers players
Durham Bulls managers
Elmira Pioneers players
Fond du Lac Panthers players
Houma Indians players
Independence Yankees players
Janesville Cubs players
Leones del Caracas players
Little Rock Travelers players
Major League Baseball first basemen
Major League Baseball third basemen
Memphis Chickasaws players
Miami Owls players
Montreal Expos scouts
New York Yankees players
Odessa Oilers players
Pittsburgh Pirates players
Quincy Cubs players
Richmond Virginians (minor league) players
Sacramento Solons managers
Sacramento Solons players
Salt Lake City Bees players
San Antonio Missions managers
San Antonio Missions players
Sioux Falls Canaries players
Tacoma Cubs players
Topeka Owls players
Twin Falls Cowboys players
Washington Senators (1961–1971) players